Night Visions is the debut studio album by American pop rock band Imagine Dragons. It was released on September 4, 2012, through Kidinakorner and Interscope Records. The album was primarily produced by the band themselves, as well as English hip-hop producer Alex da Kid and Brandon Darner from the American indie rock group The Envy Corps. According to frontman Dan Reynolds, the album took three years to finish, with six of the album's tracks being previously released on multiple EPs. Musically, Night Visions exhibits influences of folk, hip hop and pop.

The album received generally mixed reviews from music critics upon release. However, it debuted at number two on the Billboard 200 in the United States, selling more than 83,000 copies within its first week where it has since been certified double Platinum. It also peaked at the summit of the Billboard Alternative Albums and Rock Albums charts, as well as in the top ten albums in Australia, Austria, Canada, Germany, Ireland, Mexico, Netherlands, New Zealand, Norway, Portugal, Sweden, Switzerland, and United Kingdom. Night Visions appeared in the Billboard 200 top 10 in 2012, 2013, and 2014. The album became the fourth best-selling album of 2013 in the US. It was nominated for the Juno Award for International Album of the Year (2014) and won the Billboard Music Award for Top Rock Album (2014).

Background
In 2008, Imagine Dragons formed consisting of lead singer Dan Reynolds, guitarist Wayne Sermon, bassist Ben McKee, drummer Andrew Tolman, and keyboardist Brittany Tolman.  Each of the members moved to Las Vegas, Nevada to form Imagine Dragons. After playing in numerous local Battle of the Bands competitions, the band recorded and released three extended plays: 2009's Imagine Dragons, 2010's Hell and Silence, and 2011's It's Time. After the Tolmans left the band in July 2011 to be replaced with drummer Daniel Platzman in August 2011, the band was picked up by Universal Records and was signed to Interscope in November 2011.

In 2011, the band entered the studio to write and record their major-label debut extended play, Continued Silence, and additional material for a debut studio album. Continued Silence was released on February 14, 2012, and was met with critical acclaim, reaching at number 40 on the US Billboard 200.

Promotion

Singles 
"It's Time", which first appeared on the band's 2011 EP of the same name, was sent to mainstream radio in January 2012, and was released as the band's debut single on August 18, 2012. The song peaked at No. 15 on the Billboard Hot 100. The band performed the song on The Tonight Show with Jay Leno, Jimmy Kimmel Live!, Late Night with Jimmy Fallon, and Conan.

"Radioactive" was released as a radio-only single from Continued Silence and Night Visions in April and October 2012 respectively. The band performed the song on Jimmy Kimmel Live!, The Late Show with David Letterman, The Tonight Show with Jay Leno, Late Night with Jimmy Fallon, and Saturday Night Live. It reached at number 3 on the US Billboard Hot 100, as well as number 1 on the Alternative Songs chart and Hot Rock Songs chart.

"Hear Me" was released as a single on November 24, 2012. The following day, the song was released as part of a 4-track EP.

"Demons" was released to American Triple A radio on January 28, 2013, as a radio-only single. It reached at number 6 on the US Billboard Hot 100, as well as number 1 on the Pop Songs chart.

"On Top of the World" was released as the album's fifth and final single on March 18, 2013.  It peaked at No. 79 in the US.

Promotional singles
"Amsterdam" was exclusively released as a free download via iTunes. The single was released as iTunes' "Single of the Week" on the week of the album's release in countries with respective release dates of the album.

Tour
The band embarked on a 40 date fall tour to promote Night Visions.  They performed as the opening act for Awolnation, and traveled across the United States in the fall of 2012 to promote the album's initial release in North America. During the tour, the band appeared on the September 4, 2012, airing of ABC late-night talk show Jimmy Kimmel Live!. They also made an appearance on the October 29, 2012 airing of NBC late-night talk show Late Night with Jimmy Fallon performing "It's Time" to an empty audience during Hurricane Sandy's passage through the New York / New Jersey metropolitan area during that weekend.

In 2013, a world tour, entitled the Night Visions Tour, was executed in promotion of the worldwide release of Night Visions. Starting in February 2013, the 145-date tour saw the band perform across North America and Europe. With opening acts such as Señora Lanza. During the tour, the band made their first national television appearance, performing "Radioactive" on the February 22, 2013, airing of CBS late-night talk show Late Show with David Letterman. The band performed in front of cameras during their appearance at the 2013 Isle of Wight Festival for Vevo's Summer Six series.  The band made another television appearance in the United States, performing "Radioactive", "Demons" and "On Top of the World" on the July 4, 2013, airing of ABC morning television show Good Morning America.

Critical reception

Night Visions received mixed reviews from music critics. Brian Mansfield from USA Today gave Night Visions a favorable review, writing: "For all the group's musical mastery, it's the flourishes courtesy of producer Alex da Kid that make individual tracks stand out." Mansfield praised individual elements such as "the mandolin hook of 'It's Time', the jaunty whistle of 'On Top of the World', [and] the burbling guitar in 'Demons.'" and said that "those creative touches may seem like small details, but it's that imagination that gives these Dragons teeth." Gregory Heaney of AllMusic remarked that the album "sometimes feels as though it lacks depth", but nonetheless called it "an album that, at least for a few minutes at a time, will make everyday life seem just a little bit bigger".

Annie Zaleski of Las Vegas Weekly praised Night Visions for being "well-crafted and wildly creative, and boasts solid songwriting—three things that are sorely missing on albums by so many younger bands." Lisa Kwon of Consequence of Sound gave the album a mixed review and felt that Night Visions "fails to match the fresh adrenaline rush that the band's first single had promised us when we first heard it on the radio or in commercials earlier this year." Johan Wippsson from Melodic magazine called Night Visions "somewhat shattered, but as a whole this is a very charming and well-crafted album." Chris Saunders of musicOMH panned the album as "so safe and middle of the road that it leaves you with the same hollow feeling that Las Vegas can, without the dizzying high and sensual assault that got you there in the first place."

Commercial performance
The album debuted at number two on the Billboard 200 in the United States, selling more than 83,000 copies within its first week. It also peaked at the summit of the Billboard Alternative Albums chart and Rock Albums chart. It has appeared in the top ten albums on the Billboard 200 in 2012, 2013 and 2014 (as well as topping the Alternative Albums chart in each of those years) and has not fallen off the chart once as of February 25, 2015. The album debuted at number two in the United Kingdom, narrowly losing the top slot to Justin Timberlake's The 20/20 Experience. As of August 31, 2021, the album has received a 7× platinum certification in the United States by the Recording Industry Association of America (RIAA), for certified sales of 7 million units in the country alone.

The album was the fourth best-selling album in the US in 2013 with over 1.4 million copies sold for the year. As of February 2015, it had sold a total of 2.5 million copies in the US and earned double Platinum status. It was also the third best-selling album in Canada with 179,000 copies sold.

To date, three singles from the album charted in the Billboard Top 20, and five have charted on the UK Top 40. In the US, "It's Time" has sold more than 2 million copies in the United States, "Radioactive" has sold more than 10 million and "Demons" has sold more than 5 million. Both "Radioactive" and "Demons" spent more than 60 weeks on the Billboard Hot 100, making Imagine Dragons the first artist to accomplish such a feat.

Track listing

 *If no repeats are involved, deluxe tracks are placed after other bonus tracks from respective year's release.

Personnel
Imagine Dragons
Dan Reynolds – lead vocals
Wayne Sermon – electric and acoustic guitars, mandolin, backing vocals
Ben McKee – bass guitar, keyboards, backing vocals
Daniel Platzman – drums, viola, backing vocals

Additional musicians
Andrew Tolman – drums 
Brittany Tolman – keyboards, backing vocals 
J Browz – additional guitar , additional bass 
Jonathan Vears – additional guitar 
Benjamin Maughan – additional piano, additional bass

Charts

Weekly charts

Year-end charts

Decade-end charts

Certifications

Accolades

Release history

References

External links

Night Visions at YouTube (streamed copy where licensed)
 Imagine Dragons official site

2012 debut albums
Imagine Dragons albums
Interscope Records albums
Interscope Geffen A&M Records albums
Kidinakorner albums
Albums produced by Alex da Kid
Albums recorded at Westlake Recording Studios